Kang Dong-chul (born June 7, 1979), also known by his stage name Brave Brothers, is a South Korean rapper, record producer and songwriter for Brave Entertainment. He was a producer and composer for YG Entertainment from 2004 to 2008. In 2008, he started his own record label called Brave Entertainment. He has produced hit songs for After School, Sistar, 4Minute, T-ara, Son Dam Bi, Big Bang, Brown Eyed Girls, AOA, Hello Venus, RANIA and U-KISS. In 2009, he made his music debut with Attitude and later released Passionate on December 8. He has four groups under his record label: Brave Girls, Electroboyz, BIGSTAR, and DKB. Kang was a judge panelist on JTBC's Made In U program in 2011.

Music career
On October 21, representatives of RaNia revealed that Brave Brothers would be producing their album Time To Rock Da Show. He was awarded the Hallyu Composer Award at the 19th Korean Culture Entertainment Daesang Awards on December 15, 2011. He stated, "Thank you so much for honoring me with such a great award. I will return the favor with more great new songs. I would like to return this honor to the artists that express my songs and to the Brave Sound family.

Business career
On October 25, 2011, he opened a hip hop club in the Gangnam district of Seoul called Phantom.

Personal life
On KBS's Win Win, he revealed he had a troubled past with 12 violence-related crimes and owned a room salon business. He stated that everything changed when he developed a love for Cypress Hill's music and ended his relations with organized crime.

Discography

Studio albums

Extended plays

Singles

Music Credit

Awards

See also
 Park Jin-young
 Yang Hyun-suk
 Lee Soo-man

References

External links
 Brave Entertainment

1979 births
Living people
South Korean record producers
South Korean male songwriters
South Korean male rappers
South Korean music industry executives
Brave Entertainment artists